Ryder Report may refer to:

Ryder Report (Detention and Corrections in Iraq), 2003 report from the inquiry by U.S. Provost Marshal Donald Ryder into reports of abuse by American troops in Iraq
Ryder Report (British Leyland), 1975 report from the enquiry by Sir Don Ryder into the British Leyland Motor Corporation